Metasia xenogama is a moth in the family Crambidae. It was described by Edward Meyrick in 1884. It is found in the Australian states of South Australia and Western Australia.

References

Moths described in 1884
Metasia